Loudounhill (NS 60268 37191) was a railway station on the Darvel and Strathaven Railway serving a rural area that included the landmark of Loudoun Hill in the Parish of Galston, East Ayrshire, Scotland.

History

On 4 July 1905 the line opened, thereby connecting the Darvel Branch that ran from Kilmarnock, resulting in the line becoming a through route to Strathaven which was a line jointly run between the Glasgow and South Western Railway (G&SWR) and the Caledonian Railway (CR). The CR owned the Loudounhill to Strathaven section and the G&SWR owned the section from Loudounhill to Darvel and beyond.

Despite being a through route, no trains ran between Kilmarnock and Strathaven; instead, the two companies took it in turns to run the line between Darvel and Strathaven every six months. Stations were also located at Ryeland and Drumclog. The line was never successful and closed in 1939; the track was lifted in 1951.

The station had a signal box on the platform and a wooden waiting room and ticket office. The station had an island platform and a footbridge gave passengers access. A crane was present and several sidings with a goods yard and loading dock. The lengthy Loudounhill Viaduct lay to the south.

The junction between the Caledonian Railway and the Glasgow and South Western Railway was at the county boundary at Loudounhill Station. The closed line was used to store hundreds of damaged railway waggons that were awaiting repair.

The line had been intended as a through route between Lanarkshire and Ayrshire, but there was very little traffic along the route as the population in the area was very low. The station was closed from September until November 1909 and then again from January 1917 until December 1922. The last train ran on 10 September 1939, but the official closing date was two weeks later.

Other stations
 Ryeland
 Drumclog

References
Notes

Sources

Previous and next stations

Disused railway stations in East Ayrshire
Former Glasgow and South Western Railway stations
Railway stations in Great Britain opened in 1905
Railway stations in Great Britain closed in 1909
Railway stations in Great Britain opened in 1909
Railway stations in Great Britain closed in 1917
Railway stations in Great Britain opened in 1922
Railway stations in Great Britain closed in 1939